Orrell is an area in the Metropolitan Borough of Wigan, Greater Manchester, England.  It contains 14 listed buildings that are recorded in the National Heritage List for England.  Of these, one is listed at Grade II*, the middle of the three grades, and the others are at Grade II, the lowest grade.  The area is largely rural, and most of the listed buildings are houses and associated structures.  The other listed buildings include a stone post, a farmhouse, a church and a public house.


Key

Buildings

References

Citations

Sources

Lists of listed buildings in Greater Manchester